Fritz Paul (born 4 April 1942) is a German philologist who specializes in Scandinavian studies.

Biography
Fritz Paul was born in Nesselwang, Germany on 4 April 1942. After gaining his abitur in Kempten in 1962, Paul studied German and Nordic philology at the Ludwig Maximilian University of Munich and the University of Oslo. He received his Ph.D. in 1968 with a thesis on the Norwegian writer Henrik Ibsen.

From 1968 to 1972, Paul was a research assistant at the Seminar for Nordic Philology and Germanic Antiquity at the Ludwig Maximilian University of Munich, where he completed his habilitation in Nordic philology in 1972. Paul was subsequently appointed a professor in Scandinavian studies at the Ruhr University Bochum. From 1979 to his retirement in 2007, Paul was a professor in Germanic and Nordic philology at the University of Göttingen. Paul is a specialist in both Old Norse literature and modern Scandinavian literature.

He is also a fellow of the Norwegian Academy of Science and Letters from 1994.

See also
 Heinrich Beck
 Kurt Schier
 Klaus Düwel

Selected works
 Symbol und Mythos. Studien zum Spätwerk Henrik Ibsens. München 1969 (= Münchener Universitätsschriften. Reihe der Philosophischen Fakultät. Bd. 6)
 Henrich Steffens. Naturphilosophie und Universalromantik. München 1973.
 August Strindberg. Stuttgart 1979 (= Sammlung Metzler. Bd. 178). .
  (Hrsg.): Grundzüge der neueren skandinavischen Literaturen. Mit Beiträgen von Alken Bruns, Wolfgang Butt, Wilhelm Friese, Bernhard Glienke, Gert Kreutzer, Otto Oberholzer, Fritz Paul. Darmstadt 1982. (= Grundzüge. Bd. 41). 2. Aufl. Darmstadt 1991, . 
 Preise mit Sprengkraft. Skandinavien und seine Nobelpreise. Hannover 2000 (= Schriftenreihe des Niedersächsischen Landtages. Heft 38).
 Kleine Schriften zur nordischen Philologie. Wien 2003 (= Wiener Studien zur Skandinavistik. Bd. 9). .
 Zahlreiche Aufsätze zur skandinavischen und deutschen Literatur.

References

Sources
 Kürschners Deutscher Gelehrten-Kalender 2009. 22. Ausg. K. G. Saur Verlag, München 2009, .

1942 births
Living people
German male non-fiction writers
German philologists
Germanic studies scholars
Henrik Ibsen researchers
Old Norse studies scholars
Ludwig Maximilian University of Munich alumni
Academic staff of the Ludwig Maximilian University of Munich
Academic staff of Ruhr University Bochum
Scandinavian studies scholars
Academic staff of the University of Göttingen
Members of the Norwegian Academy of Science and Letters